Endoclita davidi is a species of moth of the family Hepialidae. It is known from China.

References

External links
Hepialidae genera

Moths described in 1886
Hepialidae